Nangal Dam railway station is a  railway station in Rupnagar district, Punjab. Its code is NLDM. It serves Nangal, Nangal Township and Naya Nangal town.

Trains 

 Nangal Dam–Amb Andaura Passenger
 Nangal Dam–Ambala Passenger
 Amritsar–Nangal Dam Express
 Gurumukhi Superfast Express
 Saharanpur–Nangal Dam MEMU

References 

Railway stations in Rupnagar district
Ambala railway division